Baechu-kimchi, translated as cabbage kimchi or simply kimchi is a quintessential banchan (side dish) in Korean cuisine, made with salted, seasoned, and fermented napa cabbages.

Preparation 
Baechu-kimchi is made by fermenting salted napa cabbages with Korean radish, aromatic vegetables, jeotgal (salted seafood), gochugaru (chili powder) and various seasonings. Northern varieties are milder and soupier. Southern varieties are saltier and more pungent.

Cabbages 
Korean brining salt, has a larger grain size compared to common kitchen salt, is used for the initial salting of napa cabbages. Being minimally processed, it serves to help developing flavors in fermented foods. Half of the salt is dissolved in water before putting the cabbages in, and the other half is sprinkled in between the layers of napa cabbages that were washed, trimmed, and halved or quartered lengthwise. The cabbages are salted in the brine for several hours, turned over, then salted for more hours. After that, salted cabbages are washed thoroughly under running water and drained.

Fillings 

Porridge-like thin paste is made by boiling small amount of glutinous rice flour in water. To that, gochugaru (chili powder), jeotgal (salted seafood), Korean radish, and aromatic vegetables are added to make the kimchi seasoning.

Scallions, minced garlic, and ground ginger are the most commonly used aromatic vegetables, and garlic chives, Korean parsley, onions, carrots, and chilli peppers are also often added. Korean radish is typically julienned, and the aromatics can be chopped, minced, or ground.

Jeotgal can be replaced with raw seafood in colder Northern parts of the Korean peninsula. If used, milder saeu-jeot (salted shrimp) or jogi-jeot (salted croaker) is preferred and the amount of jeotgal is also reduced in Northern and Central regions. In Southern Korea, on the other hand, generous amount of stronger myeolchi-jeot (salted anchovies) and galchi-jeot (salted hairtail) is commonly used. Raw seafood or daegu-agami-jeot (salted cod gills) are used in the East coast areas. Most commonly used aekjeot (liquid jeotgal, or fish sauce) are myeolchi-aekjeot (anchovy sauce) and kkanari-aekjeot (sand lance sauce). Aekjeot may be used in place of solid jeotgal or used along with them. Small amount of sugar, honey, fruit juice, or ground fruit can also be added.

The fillings are packed in between each leaf of the cabbages.

Fermentation 
Kimchi is placed in an onggi (earthenware) or a container, covered, and pressed down, and let ferment at room temperature for a day or two. Traditionally, kimchi is stored underground in onggi (earthenware). Today, it is more commonly stored in a kimchi refrigerator or a regular refrigerator.

See also 
 Gimjang
 Kkakdugi

References

Further reading 

 
 

Cabbage dishes
Kimchi